Mohd Fitri Shazwan bin Raduwan (born 8 December 1987) is a Malaysian footballer who last played for Penang FA in Malaysia Premier League.

Honours

Club
Selangor FA
 Malaysia Super League (2) : 2009, 2010
 Malaysia FA Cup (1) : 2009
 Malaysia Charity Shield (2) : 2009, 2010
Malaysia Cup (1): 2015

References

External links
 

1987 births
Living people
Malaysian footballers
Selangor FA players
People from Selangor
Malaysian people of Malay descent
Association football midfielders